Cardinal Records has been the name of at least three different record labels in the 20th century:

 Cardinal Records (1920s), a US based company.
 Cardinal Records (1950s), a US based company.
 Cardinal Records (1964), a Belgian based company.

See also
 List of record labels